Tianjin–Weifang–Yantai high-speed railway is a high-speed railway currently under construction in China. Weifang–Yantai section of the railway is expected to open in 2024 and Tianjin–Weifang section is expected to open in 2027.

History
On June 29, 2020, the feasibility study for the section from Weifang to Yantai was approved. The feasibility study for the section from Binhai railway station in Tianjin to Weifang was approved in January 2022. Construction of Tianjin–Weifang section started on 6 November 2022.

Route
Between Weifang North and Changyi, the route shares the line with the Weifang–Laixi high-speed railway.

Stations

References

High-speed railway lines in China
High-speed railway lines under construction